Blue Devil may refer to:
Blue Devil (DC Comics), comic character
 Blue Devil (blimp), American intelligence-gathering blimp under development in 2011
 Blue Devil (bombsight), a post-war version of the Mark XIV bomb sight
 Blue Devil (song), a traditional country-western song, revived by Hank Williams III on the Neotraditional country album "Risin' Outlaw"
 The Little Blue Devil, a 1919 play by Harold Atteridge and Harry Carroll

Blue devil may also refer to the following plants or animals:
 Paraplesiops, a genus of fishes, commonly called "blue devil"
 Echium vulgare, a European plant naturalized in North America and commonly known as "blue devil"
 Eryngium ovinum, an Australian plant commonly known as "blue devil"
 Eryngium pinnatifidum, another plant from Western Australia, also known as "blue devil"

Blue devil may also refer to the following Chevrolet Automobiles:
 Chevrolet Corvette (C6), the blue colour of Corvette ZR1 (2008-2013), commonly called "blue devil"